Minto Inlet is located east of Amundsen Gulf in western Victoria Island, at the southern end of Prince of Wales Strait in the Northwest Territories.

The inlet is part of the historical territory of the Copper Inuit.  It continues to be notable for  the Minto Inlet caribou herd calving grounds. Richard Collinson wintered here in 1851/52.

References

Further reading
 Minto Inlet and the "Blond Eskimos"

Inlets of the Northwest Territories
Inlets of the Arctic Ocean
Victoria Island (Canada)